Frank Norris Conner (October 6, 1908 – June 22, 1944) was an American hammer thrower who competed in the 1928 Summer Olympics and the 1932 Summer Olympics.

Biography
Conner was born in Exeter, New Hampshire on October 6, 1908, and studied at The Hill School and Yale University. He qualified for the 1928 Summer Olympics in Berlin by placing fourth at the U.S. Olympic Trials, throwing 159 ft  in (48.63 m) to edge out former champion Matt McGrath for the last place on the American team. In the Olympic final he placed sixth with 46.75 m (153 ft 4 in). 

Throwing for Yale, Conner was IC4A champion in 1930 with a throw of 177 ft  in (54.22 m), his personal best and the best mark in the world that year; he repeated as champion in 1931. He won the 1932 Olympic Trials with a best throw of 170 ft  in (52.09 m), but fouled on all three of his attempts at the Olympics, scoring no mark.

Conner later moved to Stockton, California, where he worked as a farmer. He died of chemical poisoning in 1944.

References

External links
 

1908 births
1944 deaths
Athletes (track and field) at the 1928 Summer Olympics
Athletes (track and field) at the 1932 Summer Olympics
American male hammer throwers
Olympic track and field athletes of the United States
People from Exeter, New Hampshire
Sportspeople from Rockingham County, New Hampshire
Male weight throwers
Yale Bulldogs men's track and field athletes
The Hill School alumni
Deaths by poisoning